Diplocalyx is a genus of bacteria of the spirochete phylum. The genus was originally established in 1968 on the basis of differential morphology when compared to other spirochete species. No species within it has been successfully grown in culture. Up to now there is only on species of this genus known (Diplocalyx calotermitidis).

See also
 List of bacterial orders
 List of bacteria genera

References

External links
 LPSN: Genus Diplocalyx

Spirochaetes
Monotypic bacteria genera